The 4th cabinet of executive ministers of Turkey (12 July 1922- 4 August 1923 ) was the fourth government formed by the nationalists during the Turkish War of Independence. The Republic was not yet proclaimed and the government was called  ("cabinet of executive ministers")

Background 
The chairman of the cabinet (equivalent to prime minister) was Rauf Bey (later named Orbay) who had recently returned from Malta after being arrested by the Allies of World War I. Both Rauf Bey and the other members of the cabinet were elected by the parliament one by one.

The government
In the list below, the name in parathesis is the surname the cabinet members assumed later.(see Surname Law of 1934)

In this cabinet, İsmet (İnönü) was the 1st and Rıza Nur was the 2nd delegates of the Turkish delegation to Conference of Lausanne.

References

1922 establishments in the Ottoman Empire
1923 disestablishments in Turkey
Politics of Turkey
Turkish War of Independence
Pre-Republic Turkey